Eastern Province  is one of the 15 provinces in the Cundinamarca Department, Colombia.

Subdivision 
The Eastern Province is subdivided into 10 municipalities:

References 

Provinces of Cundinamarca Department